was a  after Genkō and before Karyaku. This period spanned the years from December 1324 to April 1326.

Change of era
 1324 : The new era name was created to mark an event or series of events. The previous era ended and the new one commenced in Genkō 4.

Events of the Shōchū era
 1324 (Shōchū 1, 1st month): The nadaijin Saionji Kinsighe died at age 41.
 1324 (Shōchū 1, 3rd month): The emperor visited the Iwashimizu Shrine.
 1324 (Shōchū 1, 3rd month): The emperor visited the Kamo Shrines.
 1324 (Shōchū 1, 5th month): Konoe Iehira died. He had been kampaku during the reign of Emperor Hanazono.
 1324 (Shōchū 1, 6th month): The former-Emperor Go-Uda died at age 58.
 '1325 (Shōchū 2, 6th month): The former-shōgun, Prince Koreyasu, died at age 62.
 1325 (Shōchū 2, 12th month): The former-kampaku, Ichijō Uchitsune, died at age 36.
 1326 (Shōchū 3): Go-Diago's favorite, Empress Kishi, appeared to be pregnant, and the eager father-to-be visited her quarters daily; but this hope turned to regret when it turned out to be a false pregnancy.

Notes

References
 Nussbaum, Louis-Frédéric and Käthe Roth. (2005).  Japan encyclopedia. Cambridge: Harvard University Press. ;  OCLC 58053128
 Titsingh, Isaac. (1834). Nihon Odai Ichiran; ou,  Annales des empereurs du Japon.  Paris: Royal Asiatic Society, Oriental Translation Fund of Great Britain and Ireland. OCLC 5850691
 Varley, H. Paul. (1980). A Chronicle of Gods and Sovereigns: Jinnō Shōtōki of Kitabatake Chikafusa. New York: Columbia University Press. ;  OCLC 6042764

External links
 National Diet Library, "The Japanese Calendar" -- historical overview plus illustrative images from library's collection
 Kyoto National Museum  -- "Treasures of Daikaku-ji", including portrait of Go-Uda and the former-emperor's will

Japanese eras
1320s in Japan